Dating sims, or , are  video game subgenre of simulation games with romantic elements.

Dating sims are often dialog-heavy and focus on time management. The player must befriend and carefully build and maintain a relationship with one or more  characters. The gameplay is largely dependent on statistics. These games also often involve raising stats that reflect the player's skills and can be combined with other genres. Series such as Sakura Wars and Persona combine RPG gameplay with dating sim gameplay.

This can lead to confusion, as visual novels are considered a subgenre of adventure games and are not included in the dating sim genre. While the two genres often share a common visual presentation, dating sims are considered to be more statistically based, whereas visual novels focus on telling a branching story.

History 
The first game that set the standard for the dating sim genre was Dōkyūsei (1992), which relied more on timed events than dialogue choices. However, Tokimeki Memorial (1994) truly popularized dating sims in Japan, in which the player, a high school student has the ability to date a dozen different girls. Games such as Sakura Wars and Persona (both series started in 1996) are RPGs with dating sim elements.

Characteristics

In a typical dating sim, the player controls a male avatar surrounded by female characters.  The gameplay involves conversing with a selection of girls, attempting to increase their internal "love meter" through correct choices of dialogue. The game lasts for a fixed period of game time, such as one month or three years. When the game ends, the player either loses the game if he failed to properly win over any of the girls, or "finishes" one of the girls, often by having sex with her, marrying her (as in Magical Date), and/or achieving eternal love. This gives the games more replay value, since the player can focus on a different girl each time, trying to get a different ending.

Dating sims often revolve almost entirely around relationship-building, usually featuring complex character interactions and branching dialogue trees, and often presenting the player's possible responses word-for-word as the player character would say them. Dating sims such as Tokimeki Memorial, and some role-playing games with similar relationship based mechanics to the genre such as Persona, often give choices that have a different number of associated "mood points" which influence a player character's relationship and future conversations with a non-player character. These games often feature a day-night cycle with a time scheduling system that provides context and relevance to character interactions, allowing players to choose when and if to interact with certain characters, which in turn influences their responses during later conversations.

While bishōjo games make up the bulk of dating sims, other types of games exist. Games where the player character is female and potential objects of affection are male are known as GxB or otome games. Homosexual relationships are also possible, as there are games with no specific gender lines ("all pairings"). There are also Girls' Love games, which focus on female/female relationships, and Boys' Love games, which focus on male/male pairings.

There are many variations on this theme: high-school romances are the most common, but a dating sim may also take place in a fantasy setting and involve such challenges as defending one's girl from monsters.

One game series that often includes dating, with the goal of marriage, is the farming sim series Harvest Moon. The subplot of dating is more focused towards choosing one of several girls or guys (dependent on the player character's gender) and offering them presents or joining them on events in the game. The Star Ocean series of RPGs also feature dating sim elements in a similar manner.

Some Japanese dating sims may allow the player to have romantic or sexual relationships with characters in their teens. The degree of sexual content varies, but may often include intercourse. Sexually explicit dating sims may fall into the category of H Game or Eroge. Eroge only gets released to PC because large Japanese game companies do not want to release games with sexual content on their game consoles.  Because of this, Eroge companies make a censored all-ages (15+) version of the PC version for various consoles.  Censored versions often contain additional endings and added scenes to compensate for the absence of sexual scenes.

Examples
 Girl's Garden (1985)
 Tenshitachi no Gogo (1985)
 Nakayama Miho no Tokimeki High School (1987)
 Dōkyūsei series (1992 onwards)
 Tokimeki Memorial series (1994 onwards)
 True Love (1995)
 Magical Date (1996)
 Sakura Wars series (1996 onwards)
 Thousand Arms (1998)
 Persona series (2006 onwards)
 Summer Session (2008)
 Amagami (2009)
 Love Plus (2009)
 Hatoful Boyfriend (2012 onwards)
 Boyfriend Maker (2012)
 House Party (2017)

See also
 Bishōjo game
 Eroge

References

Video game genres
Social simulation video games
 
 
Video game terminology